Leptuca batuenta, commonly known as the beating fiddler crab, is a species of fiddler crab native to the tropical eastern Pacific, from El Salvador to northern Peru.

Taxonomy

Previously a member of the genus Uca, the species was transferred in 2016 to the genus Leptuca when Leptuca was promoted from subgenus to genus level.

Description
Both sexes have a pale brown to yellow carapace with some white marbling. Individuals may have green eyestalks.

Habitat
The species can be found on open mudflats and among unshaded mangrove roots. It prefers mud substrate.

References

Ocypodoidea
Crustaceans of the eastern Pacific Ocean
Taxa named by Jocelyn Crane
Crustaceans described in 1941